Pat Jordan (born April 22, 1941, in Bridgeport, Connecticut) is an American sports writer. His work has been included in the Best American Sports Writing anthology series seven times. He is also the author of A False Spring, a bittersweet memoir about his minor league baseball career, which is ranked #37 on Sports Illustrated's Top 100 Sports Books of All Time and which Time called “one of the best and truest books about baseball, and about coming to maturity in America…”

Minor league baseball player

Pat Jordan grew up in Fairfield, Connecticut, where he became a highly pursued baseball prospect after going 17–4 over three seasons (He also threw four consecutive no-hitters as a Fairfield little leaguer) for the  Fairfield Prep Jesuits. On July 9, 1959, after being pursued by over 15 major league baseball organizations, he signed a $36,000 bonus with the Milwaukee Braves, which at the time was reported to be the highest amount given to any new player signed by the organization. He reported to the McCook Braves of the Nebraska State League where he played alongside teammates and future major leaguers Phil Niekro and Joe Torre.  He struggled in the minors for three seasons, despite being one of the hardest throwing pitchers in the minors at that time, as chronicled in his memoir, A False Spring, at which point he retired and returned home to Connecticut to pursue his writing career.

Thirty-six years after throwing his last pitch for the Palatka Redlegs of the Florida State League in 1961, Jordan returned to the mound to start a game with the Waterbury Spirit of independent Northeast League in 1997. The 56-year-old acquitted himself well, allowing no hits or runs and one walk in his single inning on the mound, striking out cleanup hitter Eddie Perozo to end the frame. (Jordan was believed to be the oldest man to pitch in a pro baseball game since Hub Kittle, who threw one inning for St. Louis Cardinals Class A team in Springfield, Illinois, in 1980 at the age of 63.)

Writer

Jordan is the author of eleven books and a regular contributor to many periodicals. Jordan's work has been included in Best American Sports Writing eight times, the Best American Mystery Stories, Best American Crime Writing, Best American Essays, and the Norton Anthology of World Literature.

Best American Sports Writing

The following writings of Pat Jordan have appeared in the Best American Sports Writing anthology series:

 1993: The Wit and Wisdom of the White Rat from Los Angeles Times Magazine
 1995: Behind the Icy Glare from The Sporting News
 1996: Belittled Big Men from The New York Times Magazine
 2005: The Lion in Late, Late Autumn from The New York Times Magazine
 2006: Card Stud from The New York Times Magazine
 2006: The Magician from The Atlantic Monthly
 2010: Chasing Jose from Deadspin.com<ref>Pat Jordan, [http://deadspin.com/#!372409/chasing-jose-by-pat-jordan Chasing Jose], Deadspin.com (March 26, 2008).</ref>
 2017: Barry Switzer Laughs LastBest American Mystery Stories

The following writings of Pat Jordan have appeared in the Best American Mystery Stories anthology series:

 1997: The Mark from Playboy, July 1996
 1998: Beyond Dog from Playboy, August 1997

Best American Crime Writing

The following writings of Pat Jordan have appeared in the Best American Crime Writing anthology series:

 2002: The Outcast: Conversations with O.J. Simpson from The New Yorker 2004: CSC: Crime Scene Cleanup from Playboy, July 2003

Bibliography
 Black Coach (1971)
 The Suitors of Spring (1974)
 A False Spring (2005, Revised Edition)
 Broken Patterns (1977)
 Chase the Game (1979)
 After the Sundown (1979)
 The Cheat (1985)
 a.k.a. Sheila Doyle (2002)
 a.k.a. Sheila Weinstein (2003)
 A Nice Tuesday (2005)
 The Best Sports Writing of Pat Jordan'' (2008)

Education
Jordan graduated from the Fairfield College Preparatory School in 1959 and received his bachelor's degree in English from Fairfield University in 1965.

Personal

Jordan is married to the mother of actress Meg Ryan. They reside in Abbeville, South Carolina.

References

External links
 Official Website of Pat Jordan
 Bronx Banter: Pat Jordan

 
 

1941 births
American sportswriters
Fairfield University alumni
Living people
Writers from Fairfield, Connecticut
McCook Braves players
Davenport Braves players
Palatka Redlegs players
Eau Claire Braves players
Waterbury Spirit players
Baseball pitchers
Baseball players from Connecticut
Fairfield College Preparatory School alumni